Zhenyuan County is a county of the Qiandongnan Miao and Dong Autonomous Prefecture in the east of Guizhou province, China.

Administrative divisions
Zhenyuan county has eight towns, three townships and one ethnic township under its jurisdiction.

Geography
Zhenyuan County is located in southeastern Guizhou province. It is surrounded by Cengong County and Shiqian County on the north, Shibing County on the west, Xinhuang Dong Autonomous County on the east, and Sansui County and Jianhe County on the south.

Climate

Rivers
There are 106 rivers and streams in Zhenyuan County. Wuyang River flows through the downtown county.

Demographics

Population
As of 2013, there were 268,500 people, 81,000 households residing in Zhenyuan County, including 142,300 males and 126,200 females; the total permanent resident population was 203,200, including 77,500 urban population.

Language
Mandarin is the official language. The local people speak both Southwestern Mandarin and minority languages such as Miao languages.

Religion
The Government of Zhenyuan County supports all religions. The local people mainly believe in Chinese folk religion, Taoism, Buddhism and Catholicism.

Economy
In 2019, the GDP of Zhenyuan County reached 5.859 billion yuan.
Agriculture is an important part of Zhenyuan County's economy, of which rice farming and vegetable cultivation represent the largest sector. The forestry industry is also large sectors within the agricultural economy of the county. In addition, tourism (particularly related to history and wine) is a significant and growing portion of the economy.

Education
In 2013, there were eighty-one schools in Zhenyuan County, including two high schools, seventeen middle schools, one secondary vocational and technical school, forty-eight primary schools and thirteen kindergartens.

Culture and tourism
Major Buddhist Temples in Zhenyuan County include Zhongyuan Chan Temple. Major Taoist Temples include Mazu Temple and Wanshou Palace or Longevity Palace. Other tourist destinations include Mount Shiping.

Transportation

Rail
The Hunan–Guizhou railway, more commonly known as "Xiang–Qian railway", passes through the county.

The Zhuzhou–Liupanshui railway also passes through the county.

Zhenyuan railway station serves Zhenyuan County.

Expressway
The G60 Shanghai–Kunming Expressway, commonly abbreviated as "Hu–Kun Expressway", passes across the county.

National Highway
The National Highway G320, more commonly known as "G320", passes across the eastern county.

The National Highway G211, more commonly known as "G211", is a north-south highway passing through the western Zhenyuan County.

Provincial Highway
The Provincial Highway S306, is an east–west highway traveling through central Zhenyuan County and its downtown, commercial and industrial subdistricts.

The Provincial Highway S25, which heads north to Shiqian County and south to Jianhe County, passing through the western Zhenyuan County.

The Provincial Highway S84, from Shibing County to Zhenyuan County, is connected to the Provincial Highway S25 at Baiyangping Hub.

References

External links

 
Counties of Qiandongnan Prefecture